Straightheads is a 2007 British revenge/thriller film (titled Closure in the US), featuring brutal sexual violence, which follows a couple who seek revenge against a group of men. It was written and directed by Dan Reed, who made his directorial debut, and features Gillian Anderson and Danny Dyer.

The film went straight-to-video in the United States on 18 September 2007.

Plot
Adam, a 23-year-old self-employed security technician, is hired by businesswoman Alice Comfort to set up a security system in her flat.  After finishing the work, Adam falls asleep on her roof-garden.  When Alice arrives home and finds him there, she impulsively asks him to accompany her to a housewarming party for her boss. He is unsure, but eventually agrees. Whilst at the party, Alice and Adam have passionate sex.

Driving home from the party Alice overtakes a slow-moving vehicle, while Adam shouts an obscenity at the driver. Shortly after, Alice accidentally hits a stag.  While she and Adam are dragging the animal off the road, the car that Alice overtook earlier pulls up. Three men get out, who proceed to beat up Adam and then rape Alice.

A month passes, during which Adam and Alice physically heal but both remain emotionally wounded. On returning to work, Alice receives notification that, while she was hospitalised following the assault, her father had died. Alice drives out to his country house to put his affairs in order, and discovers a locked chest that she recognises from her childhood. Driving home, she passes a group of riders on horseback, one of whom she recognises as one of the rapists. She gets his name - Heffer - from another rider.

Alice contacts Adam, and he makes his way to her father's house where she tells him that she's found one of the men responsible for attacking them. Alice shows Adam the contents of her father's locked chest: a sniper rifle and silencer that her father apparently smuggled home after being discharged from the army. Alice says that she intends to avenge herself against Heffer.

They stake out Heffer's home with the intent to kill him.  But a young woman (later identified as Heffer's daughter, Sophie) comes out of the house looking for her dog, which Alice has killed. Alice and Adam, disturbed by having to confront the fact that their attacker is a human being, with a family, return home.

Over the next few days the couple try to decide if they should go ahead with their plan. Adam, who has been impotent since the attack, steadily becomes more aggressive and committed to the idea of murdering Heffer. Alice, however, has grown reluctant to kill Heffer now that she has seen him in a human context; instead, she sends Adam to set up security equipment in Heffer's house to try to determine the identities and locations of his friends who participated in the gang-rape.

Adam succeeds in breaking into Heffer's house and ends up in Sophie's room; initially, he merely attempts to keep her quiet so that he can get out of the house, but he has a sudden fit of rage and begins raping her. In the middle of the attack, she escapes from his grasp.  Adam returns home, able to maintain an erection for the first time since the attack.

The next day Alice uses a laptop computer that controls the security cameras and watches Heffer in his house. She realises his intention is to kill himself, and after grabbing her rifle rushes to his house. Alice finds Heffer in his garage, sitting in his car with the engine running, attempting to commit suicide by carbon monoxide poisoning. She gets him out of the car and into fresh air, saving his life. In the midst of a delirium induced by carbon monoxide, Heffer (who doesn't recognise Alice) confesses that, a month ago, his friends had intended to rape his daughter, but he convinced them to rape and beat a woman and her friend in the middle of the road instead.

Just then, Alice and Heffer hear Adam calling from outside, and Heffer suddenly turns violent, grabbing her roughly, but Alice hits him and frees herself. Adam then bursts into the house, beats Heffer, duct-tapes him to the kitchen table, and holds him down while Alice sodomises him with the barrel of the rifle that she has fetched from her car; once she is finished, she prepares to kill him, but - now pitying him because of the circumstances surrounding the rape - she decides not to pull the trigger. Adam, infuriated, takes out a hunting knife and carves out Heffer's eye. Horrified, Alice runs away; driving back to her father's home, Alice spots Sophie hitch-hiking, and invites her into her car. When Sophie realises she isn't being taken home, she asks Alice where they're headed. Alice replies, "Somewhere safe."

Back at Heffer's house, Adam taunts Heffer until he hears a car pulling up; as one of the attackers approaches the house, Adam fatally shoots him in the head before pursuing the remaining attacker through the grounds. Adam shoots the man in the leg as he flees, causing him to fall to the ground. He then bludgeons the wounded man to death with the butt of the rifle.

In the final shot of the film, Adam walks away from his victim and approaches the screen for a close-up shot, looking directly at the camera. The viewer is left to reflect on the violent revenge that has just been exacted.

Cast
Gillian Anderson as Alice Comfort
Danny Dyer as Adam
Anthony Calf as Heffer
Francesca Fowler as Sophie
Ralph Brown as Jamie
Steven Robertson as Bill

Critical reception
Rotten Tomatoes reported that 40% of 20 listed film critics gave the film a positive review, with an average rating of 4.6 out of 10.

Home Media
Ahead of its UK retail release, Straightheads became available on DVD for rental on 24 August 2007. It went on general retail release on 24 September 2007.  Dan Reed reported in his blog that himself, Gillian Anderson, and Danny Dyer recorded the commentary in December 2006. The commentary forms part of the special features for the Region 2 DVD which also included deleted scenes with audio commentary (again from Anderson, Dyer, and Reed), behind the scenes cast interviews and the theatrical trailer. Straightheads was re-released on 13 June 2011 with new cover art. It was released to Blu-ray Disc on 22 March 2010 with the same special features as the Region 2 DVD release.
For its U.S. release, Straightheads was retitled Closure and released directly-to-DVD by Sony Pictures. As per the date reported by the website DVD Times, the Region 1 DVD was released on 18 September 2007.

A Blu-ray version of the film debuted in the UK on 25 January 2010. It contains a feature commentary, deleted scenes, and trailers. The disc is Region B Locked.

The film debuted on Blu-ray for the first time in the United States on 4 April 2017 by Mill Creek Entertainment. It is included as part of a 3-pack with Perfect Stranger (2007) and Wind Chill (2007).

References

External links
 Straightblog Director Dan Reed on making Straightheads
 Straightheads at Verve Pictures
 Straightheads at Lumina Films
 

2007 films
2007 crime thriller films
British crime thriller films
Films about couples
Films scored by Ilan Eshkeri
Gang rape in fiction
British rape and revenge films
British vigilante films
2000s English-language films
2000s British films